is a city located in Hyōgo Prefecture, Japan.

Geography 
Ono is located almost in the center of the Harima Plain, on the bank of the Kakogawa River..

Neighbouring municipalities 
Hyōgo Prefecture
 Kakogawa
 Kasai
 Katō
 Miki

Climate
Ono has a Humid subtropical climate (Köppen Cfa) characterized by warm summers and cool winters with light to no snowfall.  The average annual temperature in Ono is 14.7 °C. The average annual rainfall is 1462 mm with September as the wettest month. The temperatures are highest on average in August, at around 26.4 °C, and lowest in January, at around 3.5 °C.

Demographics
Per Japanese census data, the population of Ono has grown relatively steady over the past 60 years.

History
The area of the modern city of Ono was within ancient Harima Province. The village of Ono was established within Katō  District with the creation of the modern municipalities system on April 1, 1889.  Ono was elevated to town status on May 1 1915. On December 1, 1954 Ono merged with the neighboring villages of Kawai, Kishi, Ichiba, Obe, and Shimo-Hojo to form the city of Ono.

Government
Ono has a mayor-council form of government with a directly elected mayor and a unicameral city council of 16 members. Ono contributes one member to the Hyogo Prefectural Assembly. In terms of national politics, the city is part of Hyōgo 4th district of the lower house of the Diet of Japan.

Economy
The economy of Ono is centered around agriculture and light manufacturing. The city is noted as  one of the largest producers of abacus in Japan, with over 70% market share. An official report puts the value of shipments at 1.25 million US dollars per year.  In 1976, it was designated as a traditional craft by the Minister of Economy, Trade and Industry as "Banshu Soroban". Agriculture is centered on "Yamada Nishiki" brand rice.

Education
Ono has eight public elementary schools and four public middle schools operated by the city government and two public high school operated by the Hyōgo Prefectural Department of Education. The prefecture also operates one special education school for the handicapped.

Transportation

Railway
 JR West - Kakogawa Line
  - -  -  -  
 Kobe Electric Railway
  -  -  -  - 
 Hōjō Railway Company – Hōjō Line

Highway
  San'yō Expressway Miki-Ono IC

Sister city relations
 -  Lindsay, California USA, since February 1973

Local attractions
Jōdo-ji - Jōdodō completed in 1194 is a National Treasure of Japan.
Kōdō temple ruins]], National Historic Site

References

External links 

  

Cities in Hyōgo Prefecture
Ono, Hyōgo